Bengt Roger Nilsson  he is now known as Bengt Åke Braskered (born 15 March 1967 in Vittangi, Kiruna Municipality, Sweden) is a Swedish actor.

Filmography

As a writer 
He wrote the miniseries En Kunglig Affär or A Royal Secret for Sveriges Television which covers  the events surrounding the Haijby affair, Gustaf V with Kurt Haijby a con-man.

References

Swedish male actors
1954 births
Living people
20th-century Swedish people
21st-century Swedish people